The 1989–90 season was Colchester United's 48th season in their history and ninth consecutive season in fourth tier of English football, the Fourth Division. Alongside competing in the Fourth Division, the club also participated in the FA Cup, the League Cup and the Associate Members' Cup.

Initially looking to build on manager Jock Wallace's influence towards the end of the 1988–89 season after five consecutive wins and unbeaten in eight, Colchester had a dreadful start to the new campaign, not registering a win until late September and then no further league wins until Boxing Day. By this time, Wallace had stepped aside from his role due to ill health, and after another caretaker spell for Steve Foley, Mick Mills was tasked with keeping Colchester in the Football League. Aside from a four match unbeaten run in February and early March, Mills ultimately failed as the U's finished bottom of the entire Football League and relegated to the Conference.

Only one win was registered in the cups, with a 1–0 FA Cup first round win over Brentford the only highlight prior to elimination by Birmingham City in the second round. Southend United won an Essex derby League Cup first round over two legs, and the U's failed to reach the knockout phase of the Associate Members' Cup.

Season overview
Jock Wallace began his first full season in charge with winless run stretching eight games at the start of the season, and only two league wins were registered before the turn of the decade. Assistant manager Alan Ball left the club to join Stoke City and ahead of Christmas, Wallace stepped aside due to ill health and the onset of Parkinson's disease. Steve Foley was once again placed in temporary charge of the U's first-team, but declined the offer of the role full-time instead preferring his youth team duties. Chairman Jonathan Crisp brought in former Ipswich Town and England defender Mick Mills as new manager having recently been dismissed by Stoke City.

Mills' appointment initially had a positive effect on the team, and they won three and drew one of four league games in late February and early March, but a defeat at nearest rivals Wrexham in late March, after twice leading before succumbing to a 3–2 defeat, summed up the remainder of the season. Despite having enough time to potentially improve their situation, six defeats in the final eight games of the season left Colchester bottom of the Fourth Division and so relegated to the Conference.

By now, the club were over £1m in debt, and plans for a new stadium at Wick Lane, Ardleigh had also been refused. Jonathan Crisp's initial hope of achieving Second Division football within five years of his appointment in 1985 now seemed very distant with the club out of the Football League for the first time in 40 years.

Players

Transfers

In

 Total spending:  ~ £8,000

Out

 Total incoming:  ~ £250,000

Loans in

Loans out

Match details

Fourth Division

Results round by round

League table

Matches

League Cup

Associate Members' Cup

FA Cup

Squad statistics

Appearances and goals

|-
!colspan="14"|Players who appeared for Colchester who left during the season

|}

Goalscorers

Disciplinary record

Clean sheets
Number of games goalkeepers kept a clean sheet.

Player debuts
Players making their first-team Colchester United debut in a fully competitive match.

See also
List of Colchester United F.C. seasons

References

General
Books

Websites

Specific

1989-90
English football clubs 1989–90 season
1989–90 Football League Fourth Division by team